William Reade or William Rede (1315-1385) was a medieval bishop, theologian and astronomer.

Education
Reade was initially brought up, from boyhood to maturity, by  his friend and protégé  Nicholas of Sandwich. He was then educated at Exeter College, Oxford where astronomy, mathematics, and natural philosophy flourished.  Reade's career at Oxford is unclear, but it is probable that he was studying there from 1337. He was a fellow at Merton college from around 1347 until 1357 at least, a second bursar in 1352-3 and sub-warden in 1353–54. There is some suggestion that he was also a fellow of Exeter College but there is no evidence to support this. He became a doctor of theology some time before 1362.

Career
In 1354 Reade was given letters dismissory, by the bishop of Exeter and moved to the diocese of Rochester, Kent. From the same year until 1356 he was successively subdeacon, deacon and priest in the Rochester diocese. He became archdeacon of Rochester in 1359 and provost of the college of Wingham, Kent in 1363. Then on 23 September 1368, he was nominated for Bishop of Chichester by provision of Pope Urban V, he was confirmed as  bishop of Chichester on 2 September 1369 and vacated his post as provost of Wingham at the same time. He remained as bishop of Chichester until his death.

Life

Reade was active in public life, but is better known for his collection of some 370 books. His private library was probably the biggest of its kind, in 14th century England and was larger than any of the Oxford colleges at that time.
Reade donated and bequeathed some 250 volumes shared between the libraries at Merton, Exeter, Balliol, Oriel, Queen's, and New Colleges, Oxford. Reade also provided a large sum of money to build the Merton College Library. The building, although added to over the centuries, still exists and is known today as the Mob Quad.

Reade's books covered a wide range of subjects including theology, natural philosophy, astrology and astronomy. He is known in astronomical circles for his work on Alfonsine tables. He compiled a table of solar positions between the years 1341-1344 for the Oxford meridian.

Bishop of Chichester
Reade's contribution to Chichester Cathedral was the systematic compilation of cartularies, gathering together all the charters and writings concerning the church. His cartularies have preserved virtually the only early documentary evidence about the cathedral.

Reade converted the old Manor House at Amberley, into a castle. The 19th century theologian and historian William Stephens says he did this "to provide a strong fortress for himself and  his successors against troublous times."

Reade held a deer park, in Selsey, that was plagued with poachers so much so, that the incensed bishop issued a decree excommunicating the offenders by "Bell, book, and candle", and he ordered that the ritual should be performed at all churches within the deanery. Reade died 18 August 1385, and asked in his will to be buried at Selsey parish church "once the cathedral church of my diocese...", then located at Church Norton, "...before the high altar".  His wish was not acted upon as he was buried in Chichester Cathedral without monument.  It seems that this was not the only problem with the execution of his will as the dean and chapter, of Chichester Cathedral, petitioned the executors, thirteen years later, to account for the thirteen gilt cups, bequeathed by Reade, for the use of the cathedral.

Notes

Citations

References

External links
 
 Merton College Library

 	

1385 deaths
Bishops of Chichester
14th-century English Roman Catholic bishops
Alumni of Exeter College, Oxford
Fellows of Merton College, Oxford
1283 births
Archdeacons of Rochester